Voronove is an urban-type settlement  in Sievierodonetsk Raion of Luhansk Oblast in eastern Ukraine, at about  SSE  from the centre of Sievierodonetsk city and at about  NW from the centre of  Luhansk  city. Population: 

The settlement came under attack of Russian forces during the Russian invasion of Ukraine in 2022. Since June 25, 2022, the settlement is occupied by Russian regular forces and Russian proxy forces.

References

Urban-type settlements in Sievierodonetsk Raion
Sievierodonetsk Raion